James Gordon Stewart (7 August 1927 — December 1980) was a South African footballer who played as an inside forward.

Career
In October 1951, Stewart travelled to England to sign for Leeds United from South African club Parkhill, after impressing for South Africa during a Wolverhampton Wanderers tour of the country. In just over a year at the club, Stewart made 11 first team appearances during his time at Leeds, scoring twice. In 1953, Stewart returned to his native South Africa.

References

1927 births
1980 deaths
South African soccer players
White South African people
Sportspeople from Cape Town
South African expatriate soccer players
Expatriate footballers in England
South African expatriate sportspeople in England
South Africa international soccer players
Association football forwards
Leeds United F.C. players
English Football League players